The 2007 Monaco Grand Prix (officially the Formula 1 Grand Prix de Monaco 2007) was a Formula One motor race held on 27 May 2007 at the Circuit de Monaco. It was the fifth race of the 2007 FIA Formula One World Championship.

The 78-lap race was won from pole position by Spanish driver Fernando Alonso, driving a McLaren-Mercedes. Alonso took his second consecutive Monaco win by four seconds from English teammate Lewis Hamilton, with Brazilian Felipe Massa third in a Ferrari.

Report

Background
The Grand Prix was contested by 22 drivers, in eleven teams of two. The teams, also known as "constructors", were Renault, McLaren-Mercedes, Ferrari, Honda, Spyker-Ferrari, BMW Sauber, Toyota, Red Bull-Renault, Williams-Toyota, Toro Rosso-Ferrari and Super Aguri.

Before the race, McLaren driver Lewis Hamilton led the Drivers' Championship, with 30 points, ahead of team-mate Fernando Alonso on 28 and Ferrari driver Felipe Massa on 27 points. Massa's team-mate Kimi Räikkönen was fourth, ahead of BMW Sauber's Nick Heidfeld in fifth. In the Constructors' Championship, McLaren were leading with 58 points, nine points ahead of Ferrari with 49 points; BMW Sauber were a further 26 points in third.

Testing started a week and a half before the race at Circuit Paul Ricard using the circuit's 2D SC configuration to replicate the Circuit de Monaco. Lewis Hamilton went on to score the fastest times on the days of testing whilst the circuit was in the Monaco configuration.

Hamilton, who had never lost a race on the Monte Carlo track (having won there in both GP2 and F3) played down his chances of winning the race, although he still remained "realistic" and optimistic, looking to fight for a win as is "the case with everything (he) competes in."

Six days before the race, Ferrari employee Nigel Stepney tried to sabotage Kimi Räikkönen's and Felipe Massa's cars, when a mysterious powder was found in the fuel tank of Räikkönen's and Massa's car. The parts were replaced before the race and the powder was sent to the police to be examined. Stepney was reportedly angry with Ferrari for not being promoted to technical director after Ross Brawn, left the team after last season.

Ferrari changed the colour of their car dark red which was changed to approximate the color scheme used by Marlboro.

Practice
The final practice session on Saturday morning was heavily affected by rain. Adrian Sutil of Spyker topped the timesheets for this session due to the conditions.

Qualifying

Qualifying was dominated throughout by the two McLarens of Hamilton and Fernando Alonso. Despite Hamilton setting fastest times for the first session, Alonso outpaced him in the final stages to take pole position, with Hamilton being held up slightly by Mark Webber. Felipe Massa of Ferrari qualified third fastest, posting a time after the clock stopped. Kimi Räikkönen made a mistake and hit the barriers coming out of the Swimming Pool Complex during the second qualifying stage, breaking his front-right suspension. The damage inflicted could not be repaired and he qualified sixteenth. Despite provisionally making the top ten, David Coulthard was penalised for impeding Heikki Kovalainen and demoted to thirteenth. Coulthard's demotion allowed Jenson Button to participate in the final qualifying stage, but he failed to move up the field and finished the qualifying session in 10th place.

Of those whose qualifying went well, former Monaco resident Giancarlo Fisichella fared best, putting his Renault on the second row in fourth place. Nico Rosberg's performance marked a return to form for his Williams team; his fifth place was the British constructor's best qualifying position since Mark Webber's second place at the same track one year before in 2006. Webber himself also fared well, filling the second slot on row three, alongside Rosberg, in sixth place.

Race
The race started at 14:00 CET. From the starting line everyone got away for the first laps, with Hamilton diving in behind Alonso to defend any of the Ferrari's advances. After the race, FIA launched an investigation of the McLaren team for giving out team orders, to the effect of asking Hamilton not to attempt to race or overtake Alonso. McLaren were later cleared of any wrongdoing by the FIA.

No other car in the field could keep up with the sheer pace of both of the McLaren-Mercedes, with Massa, after a competitive first stint in third place, dropping to sixty seconds behind Hamilton. Notably, he was the only car the two McLaren drivers did not lap during the afternoon.

Kimi Räikkönen came back up the field to eighth place to gain one championship point after his poor qualifying performance.

Vitantonio Liuzzi crashed out of the race on the second lap, a fate that befell Spyker driver Adrian Sutil in the second half of the Grand Prix.  The other Spyker car, driven by Christijan Albers failed to finish the race due to a mechanical problem.  The only other retirement was Mark Webber, whose Red Bull's gearbox failed in the early stages of the race.

Classification

Qualifying 

Notes
 – David Coulthard was penalised for blocking Heikki Kovalainen and not allowed to take part in Q3 despite posting the 8th fastest time of Q2, he was then given a two place grid penalty and started the race in 13th place. Jenson Button, who had qualified 11th in Q2, therefore inherited the final place in Q3 from Coulthard.

Race 

Notes
 – Heikki Kovalainen was classified as 13th and Christijan Albers was classified as 19th, because they completed 90% of the race winner's distance.

Championship standings after the race 

Drivers' Championship standings

Constructors' Championship standings

See also 
 2007 Monaco GP2 Series round

References

External links

 Detailed Monaco Grand Prix results

Monaco Grand Prix
Monaco Grand Prix
Grand Prix
May 2007 sports events in Europe